Belgium was represented by Emly Starr, with the song "Samson", at the 1981 Eurovision Song Contest, which took place in Dublin on 4 April.

Before Eurovision

Eurosong 
The Belgian preselection consisted of three heats, followed by the final on 7 March 1981. All the shows took place at the Amerikaans Theater in Brussels, hosted by Luc Appermont. Future Belgian representatives Stella Maessen (1982) and Liliane Saint-Pierre (1987) also took part in the selection.

Heats
Three heats were held with twelve songs in each, from which the top ten songs across the heats went forward to the final. The songs were not voted on at the time, but after the final heat a recap of all 36 songs was broadcast and viewers were then invited to vote for ten of the songs. Voting took place by the unusual means of filling out and submitting a lottery-style form. Prizes such as cars, holidays and home entertainment equipment were on offer to those who managed to forecast all ten qualifying songs correctly, and it is believed that over 180,000 forms were sent in. This led to some criticism that viewers were being asked to vote not for their own favourite songs, but rather for those which they thought would have the widest appeal to other people.

Final
The final was held on 7 March 1981 with the winning song chosen by a 7-member "expert" jury. Only the winner was announced, but it is understood that Liliane Saint-Pierre came second.

At Eurovision 
Prior to the contest, the song title was shortened to "Samson". On the night of the final Starr performed 16th in the running order, following Portugal and preceding Greece. At the close of the voting "Samson" had received 40 points (the highest being 8 from Yugoslavia), placing Belgium 13th of the 20 entries. The Belgian jury awarded its 12 points to Denmark.

Voting

References

External links 
 Belgian Preselection 1981

1981
Countries in the Eurovision Song Contest 1981
Eurovision